Pseudocalotes bapoensis is a species of agamid lizard. It is endemic to China.

References

Pseudocalotes
Reptiles of China
Reptiles described in 1979